Promolotra is a small genus of southeast Asian goblin spiders. It was first described by Y. F. Tong and S. Q. Li in 2020, and it has only been found in Myanmar.  it contains only two species: P. hponkanrazi and P. shankhaung.

See also
 List of Oonopidae species

References

Oonopidae genera
Arthropods of Myanmar